The Imperial Order of the Dragon of Annam was created in 1886 in the city of Huế, by Emperor Đồng Khánh of the Imperial House of Annam, upon the "recommendation" of the President of France as a jointly awarded French colonial order.  The Order was designed as a reward for services to the state, the French colonial government, or the emperor.

Awarded individuals are incorporated into the Đại Nam Long Tinh Viện (Hán tự: 大南龍星院), similar to the French National Order of the Legion of Honour.

Classes and insignia 
In its classes and insignia, the Order was modelled on the French National Order of the Legion of Honour and the other French colonial orders. The star is a composition of asymmetrical arms of rays, its central disc is in blue enamel writing golden word 同慶皇帝 ("Emporer Đồng Khánh") in Seal script, surrounding by gold-red-gold ring, and is climbed by a green dragon.

The order have five classes all are cognate with the Grand Cross, Grand Officer, Commander, Officer and Knight of the Legion of Honour, each class have specific term for civilian and military recipients.
 1st class: Khôi kỳ long tinh (魁奇龍星, for civilian), Trác dị long tinh (卓異龍星, for military)
 2nd class: Chương hiền long tinh (彰賢龍星, for civilian), Thù huân long tinh (殊勳龍星, for military)
 3rd class: Biểu đức long tinh (表德龍星, for civilian), Sinh năng long tinh (旌能龍星, for military)
 4th class: Minh nghĩa long tinh (明義龍星, for civilian), Tưởng trung long tinh (獎忠龍星, for military)
 5th class: Gia thiện long tinh (嘉善龍星, for civilian), Khuyến công long tinh (勸功龍星, for military)

Gallery

See also 
 National Order of Vietnam
 Gold Star Order

References 
 

 

 

Orders, decorations, and medals of Vietnam
Colonial orders of chivalry
Symbols of Nguyen dynasty

Awards established in 1886